Kenneth Donald Mackenzie (16 September 1876 – 1 October 1966) was an eminent Anglican priest and author in the middle third of the 20th century.

He was educated at Radley and Hertford College, Oxford and ordained in 1902. He served curacies at All Hallows', East India Docks and St John's, Upper Norwood. From 1905 to 1910 he was Fellow, Dean and Chaplain of Pembroke College, Oxford. After a further curacy at St Mary Magdalene's, Paddington he became Vicar of Selly Oak in 1915, a post he held for five years. From 1923 to 1934 he worked for the Anglo-Catholic Congress. After that he was a canon residentiary at Salisbury Cathedral until his elevation to the episcopate as Bishop of Brechin, serving until 1943.

References

1876 births
People educated at Radley College
Alumni of Hertford College, Oxford
Fellows of Pembroke College, Oxford
Bishops of Brechin (Episcopalian)
20th-century Scottish Episcopalian bishops
1966 deaths
Place of birth missing
Place of death missing